The men's team pursuit competition at the 2020 European Speed Skating Championships was held on 12 January 2020.

Results
The race was started at 14:33.

References

Men's team pursuit